Derrick Coleman (July 4, 1990 – January 19, 2018), known professionally as Fredo Santana, was an American rapper. The older cousin of Chicago rapper Chief Keef, Santana began recording music in 2011, releasing a series of mixtapes throughout 2012 and 2013.

His debut studio album, Trappin Ain't Dead, was released in 2013 via Savage Squad and peaked at number 45 on the US Top R&B/Hip-Hop Albums. Santana's second studio album, Fredo Krueger 2, a sequel to his 2013 mixtape Fredo Krueger, was released in 2017.

Santana died of a seizure on January 19, 2018.

Career 

Fredo's first mixtape, It's a Scary Site, was released on September 20, 2012. It featured production by TM88, Young Chop, 12Hunna, Leek E Leek, J-Hill, C-Sick, and Paris Bueller as well as guest appearances from Chief Keef, Lil Reese, King L, Gino Marley, Frenchie, Lil Herb, Lil Bibby, and Lil Durk. Santana's second mixtape, Fredo Kruger, was released on February 28, 2013, and featured production by 808 Mafia, Young Chop and Mike Will Made It, as well as guest appearances from Migos, Juelz Santana, Soulja Boy, Young Scooter, Fat Trel, Alley Boy, Lil Durk and Lil Reese among others. It would later be released for retail sale via iTunes on May 7, 2013.

On September 24, 2013, Fredo Santana made a cameo appearance in Drake's music video for "Hold On, We're Going Home", in which he portrayed a bad guy kidnapping Drake's "girlfriend".

His debut album, Trappin Ain't Dead, was released on November 20, 2013. The album featured guest appearances by Kendrick Lamar, Chief Keef, Peewee Longway and other members of Glory Boyz Entertainment. It's a Scary Site 2 was released on December 20, 2013.

On February 27, 2014, Santana announced that he and Keef were going to release a collaboration album Blood Thicker Than Water, which never came to fruition. On July 9, 2014, he revealed the track list for his upcoming album Walking Legend.

Personal life 
Santana was the older cousin of Chicago rapper Chief Keef.

Health issues 
Santana was a heavy user of drugs, at one point being addicted to Xanax and lean. Santana attributed his heavy drug use to trauma experienced during his childhood, admitting he had post-traumatic stress disorder and turned to drugs as a coping mechanism.

Santana was hospitalized in March 2017 after having a seizure, which he blamed on a heavy workload and his poor sleep schedule. After the seizures persisted, Santana was diagnosed with idiopathic epilepsy in May 2017 and prescribed Keppra to treat it. Despite the medicine, Santana continued to have seizures, usually multiple in a row.

Santana was hospitalized once again in October 2017 after friend and fellow rapper Gino Marley found Santana mid-seizure on the floor of his house with blood coming from his mouth. He was rushed to hospital and diagnosed with both liver and kidney failure, with the main factors being his addiction to Xanax and lean. Santana expressed interest in going to rehab while in the hospital.

Death 
On the evening of January 19, 2018, at around 11:30 p.m. local time, Santana's girlfriend discovered him unresponsive at their home in Reseda, Los Angeles. Shortly after, Santana was pronounced dead. He had a fatal seizure, and an autopsy revealed he had developed cardiovascular disease in addition to the previous conditions he had.

Discography

Studio albums

Mixtapes 
 It's a Scary Site (2012)
 Fredo Kruger (2013)
 Street Shit (with Gino Marley) (2013)
 It's a Scary Site 2 (2013)
 Walking Legend (2014)
 Ain't No Money Like Trap Money (2015)
 Fredo Mafia (with 808 Mafia) (2016)
 Plugged In (2017)

Singles

Guest appearance 
 "Familiar"  (2014)

References 

1990 births
2018 deaths
21st-century American businesspeople
21st-century American musicians
African-American business executives
African-American male rappers
American chief executives
American music industry executives
Businesspeople from Chicago
Drill musicians
Trap musicians
Midwest hip hop musicians
Rappers from Chicago
21st-century American male musicians
Neurological disease deaths in California
Deaths from epilepsy
20th-century American businesspeople
20th-century African-American people
21st-century African-American musicians